Flein Island is a small island lying  north of Berr Point in the southeast part of Lutzow-Holm Bay. Norwegian cartographers working from air photos taken by the Lars Christensen Expedition, 1936–37, mapped this feature as two islands, applying the name Fleinoya (the bare island) to the larger. The Japanese Antarctic Research Expedition, 1957–62, determined that only one island exists in this position and retained the name given earlier for the larger island.

See also 
 List of antarctic and sub-antarctic islands

References 

Islands of Queen Maud Land
Prince Harald Coast